Stanley W. "Rabbit" Benton (September 29, 1901 – June 7, 1984) was an American second baseman whose career lasted 16 seasons and almost 2,000 games—but only six games in Major League Baseball (MLB) for the  Philadelphia Phillies.

Benton's minor league career lasted from 1919 through 1934, largely in the Texas League. In the majors, he had four hits in 19 at bats in his six career games, with one double and three runs batted in.

He died in Mesquite, Texas, at age 82.

External links

1901 births
1984 deaths
Baseball players from Kentucky
Beaumont Exporters players
Charleston Pals players
Charleston Senators players
Evansville Evas players
Knoxville Smokies players
Major League Baseball second basemen
Memphis Chickasaws players
Milwaukee Brewers (minor league) players
Mobile Marines players
People from Morgan County, Kentucky
Philadelphia Phillies players
Portland Beavers players
Shreveport Sports players
Spartanburg Pioneers players
Tyler Sports players
Wichita Falls Spudders players
Williamsport Billies players